Slide guitarists are musicians who are well-known for playing guitar with a "slide", a smooth, hard object, held in the fretting hand and placed against the strings to control the pitch.  Beginning with guitarists in the American South and Hawaii in early 20th century, slide guitar styles have developed in a variety of musical settings, including blues, country, and rock.  Most slide guitarists may also perform with guitars using traditional fretting techniques; additionally, some also play various types of steel guitars, which usually lack frets and are not played by the non-picking fingers alone.

List

References

Sources

Slide guitarists